Monstret i skåpet (The Monster in the Cupboard) is a 1979 children's book by Viveca Sundvall. The book is the first in the Mimmi series.

Plot
6-year-old Mimmi keeps a diary. Only she and her friend Anders know that a monster lives inside a cabinet at the Kindergarten they go to. They believe the monster is inside a cabinet in the Kindergarten teacher's office.

References

1979 children's books
Fiction about monsters
Rabén & Sjögren books
Works by Viveca Lärn